Eichsfelder Kessel is a former Verwaltungsgemeinschaft ("collective municipality") in the district Eichsfeld, in Thuringia, Germany. The seat of the Verwaltungsgemeinschaft was in Niederorschel. It was disbanded in January 2019.

The Verwaltungsgemeinschaft Eichsfelder Kessel consisted of the following municipalities:

 Deuna 
 Gerterode 
 Hausen 
 Kleinbartloff 
 Niederorschel

References

Former Verwaltungsgemeinschaften in Thuringia